Kolkata - Jammu Tawi Express is an Express train of the Indian Railways connecting Kolkata in West Bengal and  Jammu Tawi in Jammu and Kashmir. It is currently being operated with 13151/13152 train numbers on every day week.

Service

It averages 55 km/hr as 13151 Kolkata - Jammu Tawi Express and covers 1986 km in 45 hrs 5 mins & 55 km/hr as 13152 Jammu Tawi - Kolkata Expressand covers  1986 km in 45 hrs.

Route and halts 

The important halts of the train are :

Traction

Both trains are hauled by a Mughalsarai Electric Loco Shed based WAP-7 electric locomotives from end to end

Coach composite

The train consists of 24 coaches:

 1 AC II Tier
 2 AC III Tier
 11 Sleeper Coaches
 3 General
 2 Second-class Luggage/parcel van
 1 Pantry car
 1 Military coach

Operation

13151 - Starts Kolkata Station at 11:45 AM IST Daily and reaches Jammu Tawi on 3rd Day at 9:00 AM IST.

13152 - Starts  Jammu Tawi at 6:55 PM IST Daily and reaches Kolkata on 3rd Day at 3:45 PM IST.

See also 

 Begampura Express
 Archana Express
 Himgiri Superfast Express

References

External links 

13151/Kolkata–Jammu Tawi Express 
13152/Jammu Tawi–Kolkata Express

History 
Earlier this train used to originate from Sealdah. But as Kolkata Chitpur Terminus was built this train was shifted to Kolkata (KOAA).

Rail transport in Jammu and Kashmir
Rail transport in Punjab, India
Rail transport in Uttar Pradesh
Rail transport in Bihar
Rail transport in Uttarakhand
Rail transport in Haryana
Rail transport in West Bengal
Transport in Jammu
Transport in Kolkata
Express trains in India